Afamasaga Lepuiai Rico Tupa'i (born ~1969) is a Samoan politician and Cabinet Minister. He is a member of the Human Rights Protection Party. 

Tupa'i previously worked in the media, including media agency Skylite, the Samoan Department of Broadcasting, and as one of the founders of Fiji's Mai TV. He has also worked for Digicel Pacific and the National University of Samoa. He was first elected to the Legislative Assembly of Samoa at the 2016 Samoan general election, and appointed Minister of Communication and Information Technology.

In March 2021 Tupai was accused of extracting A$90,000 from an Australian investor seeking to establish a business in Samoa. He subsequently lost his seat in the April 2021 Samoan general election.

References

Members of the Legislative Assembly of Samoa
Living people
Communication ministers of Samoa
Human Rights Protection Party politicians
Year of birth missing (living people)